Jordan Charles Vogt-Roberts (born September 22, 1984) is an American film director, film producer, screenwriter, and television director. His feature directorial debut, The Kings of Summer, screened at the 2013 Sundance Film Festival. The film also won the Narrative Feature Audience Award at the 2013 Dallas International Film Festival. In 2017, Vogt-Roberts directed the MonsterVerse film Kong: Skull Island.

Career
Jordan Vogt-Roberts first directorial credit is a 2007 documentary, Twit: Robert Buscemi, Live at the Subterranean.

Vogt-Roberts continued his career producing and directing episodes of two web series, Memoirs of a Manchild (2009-2010) and Book Club (2009-2013), and directing most episodes of the web series Single Dads (2009-2011).

After turning an episode of Memoirs of a Manchild into the short film Mint in a Box (2009), in 2010, he wrote and directed the short film Successful Alcoholics. The film screened at the Sundance Film Festival, the SXSW Film Festival, the AFI Fest and 30 other film festivals.

Vogt-Roberts went on to direct Comedy Central's Mash Up, as well as episodes of Funny or Die Presents, MTV's Death Valley and FX's You're the Worst.

Vogt-Roberts's feature film debut, The Kings of Summer, was screened at the Sundance Film Festival and the Cleveland International Film Festival, and won the Narrative Feature Audience Award at the 2013 Dallas International Film Festival.

He went on to direct Kong: Skull Island in 2017, which grossed over $565 million at the global box office.

Vogt-Roberts is directing a film based on the Metal Gear series for Sony Pictures.  In interviews, Vogt-Roberts repeatedly expressed his passion for video games, and recounted his meeting with Metal Gear creator Hideo Kojima to discuss the making of the film. In Kong: Skull Island, a boat bears the name Gray Fox as an homage to the character of the same name. As of Spring 2022, he was still attached to the project, though there was still no publicly available timeline.

Vogt-Roberts was to direct the pilot of The Walking Dead: World Beyond, but was replaced with Magnus Martens, who previously directed for Fear the Walking Dead. The change in directors was a result of the production going in a different direction; Vogt-Roberts still contributed to the first episode, however.

In 2018, it was announced that Vogt-Roberts would direct a miniseries adaptation of the 2014 book Console Wars, with Seth Rogen and Evan Goldberg executive producing the series and Paramount+ distributing it.

In 2021, it was announced that Vogt-Roberts would direct a live action adaptation of Gundam, from a screenplay by Brian K. Vaughan. The film will be produced by Legendary Entertainment and distributed by Netflix.

Sexual harassment allegation
In 2017, pornographic actress and director Dana DeArmond accused Vogt-Roberts of kissing her without her consent at a drinks date he set up with her in 2010, a few months after they wrapped work on Mash Up.

Personal life
He is Jewish. Vogt-Roberts was born in the United States and grew up in the Greater Detroit area. He moved to Arizona at 14 but went back to Royal Oak, Michigan his senior year to graduate with his hometown friends. He graduated from Dondero High School in 2003 and later Columbia College Chicago in 2006.

On September 11, 2017, Vogt-Roberts was brutally attacked while living in Ho Chi Minh City. After investigating the case with GQ journalist Max Marshall, Vogt-Roberts identified his attackers and one of the assailants was eventually arrested in India.

Filmography
Films

 The Kings of Summer (2013)
 Kong: Skull Island (2017)

Television

Video games

Commercials
Destiny 2 (2017)
PlayerUnknown's Battlegrounds (2018)
Avengers (2020)

References

External links

Jordan Vogt-Roberts official website

American film directors
American television directors
Living people
Writers from Detroit
1984 births